Maricopa is a genus of snout moths described by George Duryea Hulst in 1890.

Species
 Maricopa coquimbella Ragonot, 1888
 Maricopa lativittella Ragonot, 1887

References

Pyralidae genera
Phycitinae
Taxa named by George Duryea Hulst